Başkənd, Azerbaijan may refer to:
Başkənd, Kalbajar
Başkənd, Nakhchivan